Otomar is a given name in Czech and Slovak.

People
Otomar Hájek (1930 – 2016), Czech-American mathematician
Otomar Korbelář (1899 – 1976), Czechoslovak film actor
Otomar Krejča (1921 – 2009), Czech theatre director and anti-Communist dissident
Otomar Kvěch (1950 – 2018), Czech composer
Otomar Kubala (1906–1946), commander of the Hlinka Guard

Slovak given names
Czech given names